Edward Gately Day, Jr. (April 5, 1945 – September 3, 1987) was an American journalist and newspaper reporter who was known for taking on mobsters who dominated a number of Las Vegas casinos in the 1970s and '80s.

Biography
Day's father, also named Ned Day, was a professional bowler. After several attempts to follow his father's career path, the younger Day moved to Las Vegas in the mid-1970s.

Career
After moving to Las Vegas, Day began working as a reporter for the now-closed North Las Vegas Valley Times newspaper. He later wrote columns for the Las Vegas Review-Journal. In the late 1970s, he became the managing editor and a reporter for KLAS-TV. His trademark on-air signoff was, "I thought you'd like to know, I'm Ned Day."

In 1986, Day's car was bombed (Day was not in it, only his golf clubs). Day reportedly described it as "the happiest day in my life, when the mob firebombed my car."

On September 3, 1987, Day died on vacation while snorkeling in Hawaii, at the age of 42. The coroner's office ruled it a natural death from a heart attack.

References

External links
 
 Ned Day in Nevada Press Association Hall of Fame
 Channel 8 Tribute to Ned Day
 Tom Matthews, "Me and the Mob," Milwaukee Magazine, October 28, 2011
 "60 Years: KLAS-TV Documents Mob's Rise, Fall in Las Vegas," KLAS-TV, July 18, 2013
 Norm Clarke, "George Knapp Remembers Former RJ Columnist Ned Day," Las Vegas Review-Journal, April 12, 2015
 Sean DeFrank, "George Knapp: Seven Questions," January 20, 2011
 Ned Day Memorial Scholarship at University of Nevada Las Vegas

1945 births
1987 deaths
American male journalists
American television reporters and correspondents
Journalists from Las Vegas
Television anchors from Las Vegas
Writers from Milwaukee
Sports deaths in Hawaii